3. deild karla (e. Men's Third division) is a football league in Iceland. It is the fourth level, and second-lowest division, in the Icelandic football league system. The league was reformed into a 10-team double round-robin tournament for the 2013 season, with the introduction of the newly established 5th level of the Icelandic football league system, 4. deild karla.

Previous formats
Ever since 1982, the first season of 3. deild karla (then named 4. deild karla), and throughout the 2012 season, it was the lowest division in the league system, and as a consequence did not have a fixed number of teams. All who wished to enter and could fill certain requirements were allowed to compete, and between each season some teams quit and some new teams came in, sometimes after having previously quit. There were various formats used during the 31 seasons when Division 3 was the lowest league, the latest version using group stages and then eight-team playoffs to decide two promoted teams.

Current format
Since 2013, 3. deild karla has been a nationwide league. From 2013-2018 ten teams played in the league. But the number of teams was then increased to 12, and 2019 was the first season with 12 teams. Each team plays each other once home and once away, giving a total of 22 games per team. The two highest-placed teams are promoted to 2. deild karla, while the two lowest teams are relegated to 4. deild karla.

2013 season
In 2013 the league consisted of the two teams relegated from 2. deild karla the year before, the six teams that reached the playoffs in the previous 3. deild but did not gain promotion to 2. deild, and two teams who were decided in a playoff between the four clubs in 3rd place in their groups.

2022 Clubs

Past winners

Promoted teams shown in green

1 - Njarðvík promoted due to the merger of the 1. deild clubs Leiftur and Dalvík.
2 - ÍH promoted due to expansion of 1. deild karla to 12 teams.
3 - Tindastóll also promoted due to expansion of Úrvalsdeild karla and 2. deild karla to 12 teams.
4 - Upon promotion Hamrarnir/Vinir merged with the relegated ÍH to form ÍH/HV
5 - Árborg promoted as Tindastóll merged with 2. deild karla side Hvöt, creating a new team called Tindastóll/Hvöt, playing in the 2. deild karla.
6 - Teams that finished in 3rd-10th place (Leiknir F, Magni, Huginn, Kári, ÍH, Víðir, Augnablik and Grundarfjörður) were the only teams remaining for the 2013 season, a ten-team league consisting of those 8 teams plus Fjarðabyggð and KFR who came down from 2. deild karla. The remaining teams joined a new lowest division that launched in 2013.

References

External links
 IcelandFootball.net - List of Fourth Level Champions. 
 SOCCERWAY - 3.deild summary

 
4
Ice
Professional sports leagues in Iceland